Sunil Pokharel (born on 16 June 1963) is a Nepali theatre artist and director. He is considered one of the pioneers of modern Nepali theatre. He is a graduate of National School of Drama, India (1987). He has directed more than four dozens of varied Nepali, Indian and European plays.

Early life 
Sunil Pokharel was born in Noula village, in Khotang District in Nepal on 16 June 1963 as the first child of his parents. When he was an adolescent, his family moved to Mangalbare in Morang district, near Biratnagar. He completed his school education from Gograha Higher Secondary School in Biratnagar.

Education 
Pokhrel got a scholarship to study at National School of Drama (NSD) in New Delhi, India in 1984. He earned his diploma indrama from this Indian government owned institution.

Career 
Sunil Pokharel started his career as a theatre artist at the age of thirteen, when he was in School. In initial days, he worked with artist and director Badri Adhikari and Ramesh Budhathoki in Biratnagar. Later, he moved to Kathmandu and worked in guidance of veteran Nepali theater artist Harihar Sharma. While working in Kathmandu, Pokharel got a scholarship to study at National School of Drama (NSD) in New Delhi, India.,
After returning from his study in NSD, Pokharel established Aarohan Gurukul, the first drama school in the country. He is the artistic director of Aarohan Theatre Group and Principle of Gurukul: school of theatre.

Family 
Sunil Pokhrel is the elder brother of Nepalese pop singer Sugam Pokhrel.

Major works

As a director
 Agniko Katha - by Abhi Subedi
 Yajnaseni - by Suman Pokhrel 
 Mayadeviko Sapana - by Abhi Subedi
 Putaliko Ghar - (Nepali translation of Henrik Ibsen's Dolls House)
 Nyayapremi - (Nepali translation of Albert Camus's Les Justes)
 Midnait Samar Sapana - (Nepali translation of William Shakespeare's A Midsummer Night's Dream)
 Jayamaya Aaphu Matra Lekhapani Aaipugi (Based on a story of same title by Indra Bahadur Rai)
 Hariyo Dhunga  (Based on a story of same title by Upendra Subba)
 Arko Artha Nagalema (Based on newspaper articles written by Sharat Chandra Wasti and published in Kantipur Daily)

As an actor
 Putaliko Ghar - (Nepali translation of Henrik Ibsen's Dolls House)
 Jaat Sodhnu Jogiko - (Nepali translation of Vijay Tendulkar's Jāt Hi Poochho Sādhu Ki) 
 Nyayapremi - (Nepali translation of Albert Camus's Les Justes)
 Khariko Ghero - (Nepali translation of Bertolt Brecht's The Caucasian Chalk Circle)
 Idamitham - by Sarubhakta

As a translator
 Translation of the play Dolls House by Henrik Ibsen in Nepali as Putaliko Ghar''

Awards 
 National Talent Award conferred by Government of Nepal

References

External links 
 No easy exit
 A study in the absurd
 The Guru of Gurukul
 Sunil Pokharel admitted to ICU
 The Bard on Nepali stage
 Adapting the timeless dream
 Delightful dreams
 THE STORY OF FIRE
 An interview

1963 births
Living people
Nepalese male stage actors
Nepalese theatre directors
21st-century Nepalese male actors
20th-century Nepalese male actors
People from Khotang District
People from Morang District
People from Lalitpur District, Nepal
National School of Drama alumni